The Marshal of Brabant (erfmaarschalk van Brabant/ maréchal-héreditaire de Brabant) is a hereditary royal officeholder and chivalric title at the Court of Brabant.

History 
During war the Marshal was responsible for the safekeeping of abbeys and citizens, who could become victims during the fights. In the late Middle Ages the Marshall took part in peace treaties. During the ceremonial he was present together with the council of war. In 1160 the Lords of Wesemael had the privilege of this ceremonial office.

List of Marshals of Brabant

House of Wesemael 

Arnold I, Lord of Wesemael, Marshall of Brabant.
Arnold II, Lord of Wesemael and Westerloo, Marshall of Brabant
Arnold III, Lord of Wesemael and Westerloo, Marshall of Brabant
Godefrey, Lord of Wesemael, Marshall of Brabant
Arnold IV, Lord of Wesemael, Marshall of Brabant
Arnold V, Lord of Wesemael, Marshall of Brabant
Guillaume I, Lord of Wesemael, Marshall of Brabant,married to Joanne of Falais.
Guillaume II, Lord of Wesemael, Marshall of Brabant. Dies without heirs
Jean I, Lord of Wesemael, Marshall of Brabant,married to Ida, Lady of Ranst
Jean II, Lord of Wesemael, Marshall of Brabant; died without heirs.

House of Brimeu 
Jean of Croÿ, Lord of Roeulx gifted the dominium of Wesemael to Guy of Brimeu in 1471

Guy of Brimeu, Lord of Meghen and Humbercourt; Marshall of Brabant.
Adrian of Brimeu, 1st Count of Meghen; Marshall of Brabant: died in the Battle of Marignan, 1515.
Eustache of Brimeu, 2nd Count of Meghem; Marshall of Brabant
Charles de Brimeu; Marshall of Brabant

House of Schetz

Gaspard II Schetz acquired the dominium of Wezemael from Charles de Brimeu.
Lancelot I Schetz; Marshall of Brabant dies without heirs.
Anthonie II Schetz.
Lancelot II Schetz; Marshall of Brabant 
Anthony III Ignace Schetz; Marshall of Brabant

References

Court titles in the Ancien Régime
Nobility of the Duchy of Brabant